Requiem for Dominic is a 1991 Austrian drama film directed by Robert Dornhelm. The film was selected as the Austrian entry for the Best Foreign Language Film at the 63rd Academy Awards, but was not accepted as a nominee.

Cast
 Georg Hoffmann-Ostenhof
 Georg Metzenrad
 Felix Mitterer
 Werner Prinz
 Antonia Rados
 August Schmölzer
 Nikolas Vogel

See also
 List of submissions to the 63rd Academy Awards for Best Foreign Language Film
 List of Austrian submissions for the Academy Award for Best Foreign Language Film

References

External links
 

1991 films
1991 drama films
Austrian drama films
1990s German-language films
Films shot in Romania
Self-reflexive films
Docufiction films
Works about the Romanian Revolution
Films directed by Robert Dornhelm